Magdalena of Saxony (7 March 1507 – 25 January 1534) was Margravine of Brandenburg, its "Electoral Princess", the Electoral equivalent of a crown princess.

She was the daughter of George the Bearded, Duke of Saxony and his wife Barbara. Magdalena's maternal grandparents were Casimir IV of Poland and Elisabeth of Austria, daughter of Albert II of Germany.

She was a granddaughter of the Elisabeth aforementioned, mother of the Jagiellonians, queen of Poland, who had claimed the Duchy of Luxembourg in 1460s as being the younger daughter of the last Luxembourg heiress Elisabeth of Luxembourg, Queen of Bohemia. Though by no means an heiress of her grandmother, she was intended to wed the heir of her grandmother's older sister. Joachim (1505–1571), the future elector of Brandenburg, was the eldest son and heir of their current claimant of Luxembourg, Joachim I, Elector of Brandenburg (1484–1535), the eldest son and heir of Margaret of Thuringia (1449–1501), Dowager Electress of Brandenburg, herself the eldest daughter and heiress of Anna, Duchess of Luxembourg and William of Saxony, Landgrave of Thuringia.

Magdalena was thus married, at Dresden, on 6 November 1524, to her second cousin's son Joachim Hector, the future Elector of Brandenburg. Their son was John George, another future Elector of Brandenburg. After Magdalena's death which occurred well before Joachim ascended the electorate, Joachim II Hector married Hedwig Jagiellon, daughter of King Sigismund I of Poland.

Magdalena and Joachim II Hector had issue:
 John George, Elector of Brandenburg (1525–1598), had issue
 Barbara of Brandenburg, Duchess of Brieg (1527–1595), had issue
 Elisabeth (1528–1529)
 Frederick IV of Brandenburg (1530–1552), Archbishop of Magdeburg and Bishop of Halberstadt
 Albrecht (1532–1532)
 Georg (1532–1532)
 Paul (1534–1534)

Ancestry

House of Wettin
Nobility from Dresden
1507 births
1534 deaths
Electoral Princesses of Brandenburg
Margravines of Germany
Albertine branch
Deaths in childbirth
Daughters of monarchs